WPVL (1590 AM), is an American radio station broadcasting a sports format. WPVL, which is licensed to Platteville, Wisconsin, is owned by QueenB Radio Wisconsin, Inc. and features programming from ESPN Radio. Former call signs used by WPVL have been WTOQ and WSWW. The station's current letters were formerly held by WPVL in Painesville, Ohio. Prior to their current sports format, the station programmed oldies music.

In April 2012, WPVL was granted a U.S. Federal Communications Commission construction permit to move to a new transmitter site, decrease day power to 970 watts, and decrease night power to 470 watts.

References

External links

FCC construction permit

Morgan Murphy Media stations
PVL
Sports radio stations in the United States